Magnetohydrodynamics  is a peer-reviewed physics journal published by the Institute of Physics of the University of Latvia, covering fundamental and applied problems of magnetohydrodynamics in incompressible media, including magnetic fluids.  This involves both classical and emerging areas in the physics, thermodynamics, hydrodynamics, and  electrodynamics of magnetic fluids. , the editor-in-chief is Andrejs Cēbers of the Institute of Physics of the University of Latvia. Since 2001 the journal has been published solely in English.

The English and online edition were published by Kluwer Academic Publishers (now part of Springer-Verlag) through volume 36, number 4 (2001). Now the entire content is available by subscription directly from the journal’s website.

Abstracting and indexing 
The journal is abstracted and indexed in the Science Citation Index Expanded, as well as the Journal Citation Reports, and Inspec.

References

External links

Physics journals
Fluid dynamics journals
Publications established in 1965
Magnetohydrodynamics
Springer Science+Business Media academic journals